The Florida Flame was an NBA Development League team based in Fort Myers, Florida.

The Flame announced they would temporarily shut down operations during 2006–07, due to not having a home arena in which to play. The team maintained its league membership in hopes of finding a venue for the next season. When that didn't happen, the Flame quietly folded all operations in late 2007.

Franchise history 
The North Charleston Lowgators began play in the National Basketball Development League in 2001–02. The team was renamed the Charleston Lowgators in the fall of 2003. The Charleston Lowgators relocated to Fort Myers in fall 2004 and became the Florida Flame. In September 2005, the NBA announced that the Flame would be affiliated with the Boston Celtics, Miami Heat, Minnesota Timberwolves, and Orlando Magic for the upcoming season.

Players of note 

 Kirk Haston
 Carl English
 Earl Barron
 Dorell Wright
 Gerald Green
 Dwayne Jones
 Andre Barrett
 Theron Smith
 Bracey Wright
 Smush Parker
 Chuck Eidson 
 Tierre Brown
 Ime Udoka

Roster at end of 2005–06 season

Year-by-year record

NBA affiliates

Florida Flame
Boston Celtics (2005–2006)
Miami Heat (2005–2006)
Minnesota Timberwolves (2005–2006)
Orlando Magic (2005–2006)

Charleston Lowgators
None

 
Basketball teams established in 2001
Basketball teams disestablished in 2006
Basketball teams in Florida
2001 establishments in South Carolina
2006 disestablishments in Florida
Sports in Fort Myers, Florida